The Sony Ericsson K550 is a mid range mobile phone. Announced on February 6, 2007, it was the successor of the K510 model sensor with two-LED photolight and an active lens cover for the camera lens protection and easy camera activation when taking pictures from the phone. The phone has a variant in the form of K550im which was the first i-mode enabled phone bearing the Cyber-shot logo trying to build into the success of the Sony Ericsson K610im model. The phone was one of the first Sony Ericsson models in which the user can find the Fast-Port system connector at the left side instead on the typical bottom part.

Technical features
 Estimated CPU class: ARM9 201 MHz 
 2-megapixel (1632 x 1224 pixels) camera with autofocus, 2 LED Photolight, active lens cover
 2.25x digital zoom
 Quad-band GPRS/EDGE support
 Internet browser
 MP3, WMA/AAC playback
 77 MB internal memory, expandable with memory stick micro slot up to 2 GB
 FM radio with RDS and track ID music recognition
 Bluetooth 2.0 with support for stereo sound output (A2DP)
 Java MIDP 2.0 based from Sony Ericsson's Java Platform 7
 Real multitasking (runs up to 5 Java applications at one time)
 SAR 1.25 W/kg (10g) 
262k color TFD LCD (thin film diode) 176 x 220 pixels
Li-Po 950 mAh (standby time of 350 hours, 7 hours of talk time)

Design
The K550i design is similar to other models in the cyber-shot range, but it is slimmer than some of the other K series phones (such as the K790 and K800). Its keyboard layout is also redesigned relative to those models

Modifications

Just like its fellow Sony Ericsson models since the K750/W800/W810, the K550 can be modified in various ways (such as modifying its camera driver to improve camera image quality or acoustic driver for better sound reproduction). Tutorial on changing the Camdriver These two modifications are easily the most popular modifications available for the K550 user as well as other Sony Ericsson model users. The phone menu can also be modified, enabling changing menu icons, layouts, and even the media player background. A Sony Ericsson W610 housing fits the K550, since hardware-wise the two are identical. It is also possible to flash the K550 with W610 firmware which features Walkman 2.0 and flash menus pre-installed, but features like the slide shutter which is native to the K550i will not be available in the flashed version considering the  W610i does not support the architecture.Tutorial on flashing a K550 to W610

References

External links
Sony Ericsson K550i product overview
Sony Ericsson K550 GSMArena review
Sony Ericsson K550 specifications GSMArena

K550
Mobile phones introduced in 2007
Cyber-shot cameras
Mobile phones with infrared transmitter

pt:Sony Ericsson K550